Reginald Cribb is an Australian playwright and actor.

Early life 
Cribb graduated from National Institute of Dramatic Art at the University of New South Wales in 1990 and his first play, Night of the Sea Monkey, was performed in 1999.

Plays 
Cribb's plays include:
 The Return (adapted to the film Last Train to Freo)
 Last Cab to Darwin
 Gulpilil
 The Chatroom
 Ruby's Last Dollar, an adaptation of Uncle Vanya
 Unaustralia
 Mt Ragged
 Night of the Sea Monkey
 Krakouer 
 Country Song, a play about Australian indigenous singer and musician Jimmy Little performed by the Queensland Theatre Company at the Cremorne Theatre at the Queensland Performing Arts Centre (August 2015) 
 Thomas Murray and the Upside Down River, a play about a man ravaged by drought, family secrets and love performed by the Griffin Theatre in January 2016 then touring nationally in 2018

With Rachel Perkins, Cribb co-wrote the screenplay for the movie Bran Nue Dae based on the 1989 stage musical Bran Nue Dae written by Jimmy Chi.

Acting career
Cribb appeared in the film A Country Life.

He appeared in Home and Away during the 1990s, with appearances in G.P., A Country Practice and Police Rescue. He also sang the song "Banana Holiday" on the ABC children's TV series Bananas in Pyjamas with Monica Trapaga as well as the main cast of the show.

Stage history includes Rosencrantz and Guildenstern Are Dead, Hester, The Players, Face to Face, Romeo and Juliet and The Turning.

Awards
Last Cab to Darwin – 2003 Qld Premier's Literary Award, 2003 Patrick White Playwrights’ Award, 2003 WA Premier's Award for Best Script, overall 2003 WA Premier's Award (the first to win this award), 2003 WA Equity Award for Best New Script. Shortlisted for the Victorian Premier's Literary Award, the NSW Premier's Literary Award and the 2003 Australian Writers’ Guild Award.
The Return – 2001 Patrick White Playwrights’ Award and shortlisted for the 2001 Qld Premier's Literary Award.
The Chatroom – shortlisted for the 2004 Patrick White Playwrights’ Award, the 2005 Qld Premier's Literary Award and the 2005 WA Premier's Literary Award.
Gulpilil – shortlisted for the 2001 Australian Writers’ Guild Award.
Ruby's Last Dollar – shortlisted for the Victorian Premier's Literary Award and the WA Equity Awards.
Screenplay for Last Train to Freo – 2006 WA Premier's Award. Nominated for the 2006 Qld Premier's Literary Award and Victorian Premier's Literary Award, as well as a 2006 AWGIE and Best Adapted Screenplay in the 2006 AFI Awards and Critics Circle Awards.
 Country Song it won the 2013 Rodney Seaborn Playwright's Award for New Work.
In 2015, Cribb was the Professional in Residence at the Perth's Film & Television Institute.

References

External links
List of plays and awards

Australian male dramatists and playwrights
Australian male soap opera actors
Australian male stage actors
Year of birth missing (living people)
Living people